Wilczek may refer to :

 Wilczek (surname), a Polish surname
 Palais Wilczek, a palace in Vienna
 Wilczek Land, a large island in the Russian Arctic
 Wilczek Island, a smaller island in the Russian Arctic

See also